The Château de Flaugergues is a country house near Montpellier, Occitanie, southern France. It is one of many folies erected by wealthy merchants on the outskirts of the city.  The house preserves antique furniture and a collection of Flemish tapestries.

History 
The folies in the region were constructed by aristocrats serving the French king. In 1696, Etienne de Flaugergues, member of the Cour des Comptes, bought a piece of land and built the mansion which henceforth carried his name. It took him 45 years to give the house its current appearance. From then on, Flaugergues became an example for the various other folies constructed by wealthy merchants surrounding Montpellier.

In 1811, the Boussairolles family bought the estate, and Charles Joseph de Boussairoles designed the orangerie and the park in English garden style in 1850. Inherited by generations of nobles, it still gives an idea of the life of the French nobility in the 17th century.

The château has been a Monument historique since 1986.

Architecture 
It is not so much the building itself as the use that is made of the area surrounding it that makes Flaugergues interesting architecturally speaking. The architect is not known, but it is certain that multiple people worked on the estate between 1696 and 1730. Much use is made of the difference in terrain level, creating separate spaces within the garden, and making the mansion look grander than it in fact is.

The façade is cut in half by a doorway with Doric pilasters, carrying an entablature with rose sculpted metopes. The different levels of the house are emphasized by bands, which was fashionable in the 17th century. The large windows give the first level an air of importance, while the back wall of the building is almost blind.

The most striking part of Flaugergues is the interior, with the staircase taking up almost one-third of it. Every floor is served by this staircase with its characteristic hanging key vaults and wrought iron banisters.

Wine 
Since Roman times, vines have been grown on this spot. A descendant of Jean-Baptiste Colbert now produces the Flaugergues wine. It is part of the Mejanelle, one of the twelve terroirs of the Coteaux du Languedoc AOC.

References

External links
 Flaugergues website

Buildings and structures in Montpellier
Châteaux in Hérault
Castles in Hérault
Gardens in Hérault
Monuments historiques of Hérault
Historic house museums in Occitania (administrative region)
Museums in Hérault
Tourist attractions in Montpellier